The 1946 Fayetteville State Broncos football team was an American football team that represented Fayetteville State Teachers College (now known as Fayetteville State University) as an independent during the 1946 college football season. In its second season under head coach William A. Gaines, the team compiled a 7–3 record, lost to Allen in the Piedmont Tobacco Bowl, and outscored all opponents by a total of 110 to 102.

Schedule

References

Fayetteville
Fayetteville State Broncos football seasons
Fayetteville State Broncos football